Hedemora Circuit was a motorsport race track located in Hedemora, Sweden. In 1958, it hosted the first Swedish motorcycle Grand Prix of MotoGP.

The circuit closed in 1999.

External links
Track information

Motorsport venues in Sweden
Grand Prix motorcycle circuits
Buildings and structures in Hedemora Municipality
Defunct motorsport venues